is a Japanese tokusatsu TV drama series that began airing on July 26, 2020, until June 27, 2021. It is the fourth installment in the Girls × Heroine Series produced by Takara Tomy and OLM, Inc. (with the assistance of Shogakukan and EXPG Studio).

The series starring Miyu Watanabe, Rina Yamaguchi, Yui Yamashita and Yura Sugiura. Additional cast members include Keiji Kuroki and Saeko Kamijō. The plot centers around Lovepatrina, a group of young girls who protect people's love from the antagonist Warupyoko, who plans on removing love from the world to create his own.

The show launched a brief idol career for the main cast members, who perform as the Japanese idol girl group lovely². Following the show's end in 2021, it was succeeded by Bittomo × Heroine Kirameki Powers!

Plot 
A girl named Tsubasa Aiba is nominated to become a Lovepatrina after meeting a rabbit-like fairy from Mimipyoco named Lovepyoco. In order to save her mother, whose love has been taken by the Warupyoco Troupe—a team of villains trying to steal the world's love—she transforms into a Lovepatrina, Lovepat Pink. With the guidance of Director Loveji, she fights alongside Sarai, a cheerful girl with a mysterious past and Kohana, an honor student and athlete. Later, Sora joins the team, making Lovepatrina a quartet.

Characters

Lovepatrina 
Lovepatrina is a group of four girls who fight against the Warupyoco Troupe from stealing the love from the world. The Lovepat Cards give them various abilities they can use with the Lovepat Shuffle. As the series goes on, they hold a special item called Lovepat Pyoco Heart and using a Fluffy Card and Boing-Boing Card, which allow them to transform into Lovepyocorina.

 Played by: Miyu Watanabe
 Tsubasa is a bright, energetic, love-filled girl who wants to protect love. Her mother is a famous novelist who is turned into a Love Zero. She transforms into  and uses animal-themed attacks. Her catchphrase is, "Even if my love goes dark, my wings of love will go la-la-love!"

 Played by: Rina Yamaguchi
 Sarai is a returning character from Secret × Heroine Phantomirage!, who was transformed from an abandoned doll into a human girl. Having admired heroines for a long time, she loves sweets and is always bright and positive. She transforms into  and uses sweets-themed attacks. Her catchphrase is, "At any time, it's us! We're completely in love!"

 Played by: Yui Yamashita
 Kohana is an honors student who is also talented at sports and loves gardening. She transforms into  and uses flower-themed attacks. Her catchphrase is, "No matter who, everyone is a beautiful flower! To blossom, love must be in full bloom!"

 Played by: Yūra Sugiura
 Sora is the Lovepatrinas' classmate who loves looking at the sky. After discovering their secret, she joins the Lovepatrinas' headquarters as mission control. She eventually becomes a Lovepatrina due to her wanting to protect her friends. She holds a Lovepat Skyly to transforms into  with rainbow-themed attacks. Her catchphrase is, "Love is, for certain, in your heart! Love is shining brightly!"

Secret Headquarters 

 Voiced by: Saeko Kamijō
 A bunny-like fairy who comes from a distant star called "Mimipyoco" and is searching for a love-filled person.

 Played by: Keiji Kuroki
 At first glance, he is cool, and his heart is lovely. He founded and directs the Police × Heroine Lovepatrina to protect Earth's love from the Warupyoko Troupe.

 Played by: Iku Fujihara
 The new chief at Lovepat's secret headquarters. He loves Love Pat and gets excited easily. He is also a senior at Tsubasa's school.

Warupyoco Troupe 

 Voiced by: Toshiyuki Toyonaga
 The boss of the Warupyoko Troupe, who have come from the star "Mimipyoco." He wants to take the treasure called "Love" that humans have in their hearts to try and create his own Earth. He was childhood friends with Lovepyoco.

 Played by: Yū Yashiro
 A leader of the Warupyoko Troupe. She loves the indoors.

 Played by: BOB
 The brain of the group. He packs people who are full of love and makes them Love Zeros.

 Played by: Hosaki Tanaka
 The powerhouse of the group. He takes away love.

Others 

 Played by: Sayaka Isoyama
 Tsubasa's mother, a novelist who wrote the series "The Great Detective Magure," which became a movie.

A cute-faced demon who that came out of the mysterious egg.

Production 
On Oha Suta, a "big announcement" on May 28, 2020, officially announced Police × Heroine Lovepatrina! for the first time. The show stars Miyu Watanabe, Rina Yamaguchi and Yui Yamashita. Lovepatrina was trademarked in February 2020. Yura Sugiura was later confirmed to be Lovepat Shine.

Prior to this season, Yamaguchi appeared in Phantomirage as Sarai, and producers later confirmed that her character will return in Lovepatrina as a main character. Watanabe also participated in LDH The Girls Audition in 2018. Yamashita was also a member of EXPG Lab. In addition to the main cast, the show's supporting cast includes Keiji Kuroki (EXILE), Iku Fujihara (EXPG Lab), Yuu Yashiro, BOB, Hosaki Tanaka and Sayaka Isoyama. Saeko Kamijou voices Lovepyoko with Phantomirage narrator, Toshiyuki Toyonaga voicing Warupyoko as well the narrator.

Episode 32, which aired on March 7, 2021, was a crossover episode arc with episode 51 of Tomica Kizuna Gattai Earth Granner. Lovepatrina features Earth Granner R and Earth Granner K, while Tomica Kizuna Gattai Earth Granner features a crossover episode with the Lovepatrina members appearing in animated format.

During the show's run, Watanabe, Yamaguchi, Yamashita and Sugiura performed as their characters at events and released music under the name Lovely² (stylized as lovely² and pronounced "lovely lovely"). Girls² sang the opening themes "Daiji na Mono" and "Girls Revolution" with Lovely² making a feature in the songs.

Media

Episode list 

Police × Heroine Lovepatrina! was broadcast weekly from July 26, 2020, on TV Tokyo at 9:00 AM.

Soundtrack

Throughout Lovepatrina'''s run, a promotional idol girl group consisting of the main cast called Lovely2 (pronounced "lovely lovely") was created to perform theme songs. They were first announced as a trio on July 19, 2020, before officially debuting on September 30. Their fourth member, Sora (played by Yura Sugiura), joined the unit on October 11. They disbanded on June 30th 2021.

Singles

Film

On November 22, 2020, a theatrical film titled Gekijouban Police x Heroine Rabupatorina! Kaitou kara no Chousen! Rabu de Papatto Taihoseyo!'' was announced. The film's theme song is "STARRRT!" by Girls² with Phantomirage and the remaining five members of the girl group to make a cameo appearance. The Love Diamond is distributed as a theater gift. The movie was originally scheduled to release on April 29, 2021, but due to the COVID-19 pandemic, it was postponed to May 21.

References

External links
 

2020 Japanese television series debuts
Girls × Heroine! television series
Japanese children's television series
Japanese drama television series
Magical girl television series
OLM, Inc.
Tokusatsu television series
TV Tokyo original programming